Augusto Testa  (born 1950) is an Italian amateur astronomer and a discoverer of minor planets, observing at the Sormano Astronomical Observatory in northern Italy. According to the Minor Planet Center, he has discovered numerous asteroids during 1994–2000, all of them in collaboration with other astronomers (see table legend). In recognition of his achievements, the main-belt asteroid 11667 Testa, discovered by Luciano Tesi and Andrea Boattini at San Marcello Pistoiese Observatory in 1997, was named after him.

List of discovered minor planets

References 
 

1950 births
Discoverers of asteroids

20th-century Italian astronomers
Living people
Place of birth missing (living people)